Ishtam is a 2001 Indian Malayalam-language romantic comedy-drama film directed by Sibi Malayil and written by Kalavoor Ravikumar. It stars Dileep and Navya Nair (in her acting debut), with Nedumudi Venu, Innocent, Sreenivasan, and Jayasudha appearing in supporting roles. The music was composed by Mohan Sitara. Ishtam was remade in Hindi as Mere Baap Pehle Aap by Priyadarshan.

Plot

Pawan, whose mother died twenty four years ago when he was a child, lives with his father Krishnankutty Menon, a rich businessman. His father frequently and hilariously gets in trouble with the police officer Mariamma, mostly due to his best friend, Narayanan. Anjana meets Pavan whom he ragged her and cut her hair for which she left the college. So Anjana plans to take a sweet revenge by making a false call. After all those fun incidents, Anjana meets Pavan and then Pavan regret for his mischief he had done to Anjana and then they both become friends. Anjana lives with an spinster music teacher, Sridevi.At Anjana's friend's marriage, Krishnankutty Menon saw Sridevi and it turns out that Krishnankutty Menon and Sridevi were actually star-crossed lovers when they were young. Pavan, Anjana, Narayanan and Pavan's brother, Vipin plans to reunite them after all these years - and in the process, Pavan and Anjana discover their feelings for each other as well.

Cast

Dileep as Pavan K Menon aka Pavi
Navya Nair as Anjana Pillai(Rose), Pavi's childhood friend
Nedumudi Venu as Krishnankutty Menon, father of Pavi and Vipin
Jayasudha as Sreedevi Teacher
Sreenivasan as Vipin K Menon
Innocent as Narayanan, friend of Krishnankutty Menon
Balachandra Menon as Gokul Das (Anjana Pillai's Father)
Suma Jayaram as Girija Menon
Jyothirmayi as Jyothi
Kalpana as Mariamma Thomas
Arun Ghosh as Jyothi's Husband
Deepika Mohan as Jyothi's Mother
Niyas Backer as Babukuttan
Bindhu Krishna

Soundtrack 
The film's soundtrack contains 8 songs, all composed by Mohan Sitara and Kaithapram Damodaran Namboothiri and sachidanandan puzhankara

Box office
The film was commercial success.

References

External links
 

2000s Malayalam-language films
2001 romantic comedy-drama films
2001 films
Malayalam films remade in other languages
Films directed by Sibi Malayil
Films scored by Mohan Sithara
2001 comedy-drama films
Indian romantic comedy-drama films
Films shot in Thrissur